was a district located in Fukushima Prefecture, Japan.

On November 1, 2004, the village of Kitaaizu was merged into the expanded city of Aizuwakamatsu, as a result of which the village and district dissolved.

As of 2003, the district had an estimated population of 7,603 and a density of 269.80 persons per km2. The total area was 28.18 km2.

Towns and villages
 Kitaaizu (now part of Aizuwakamatsu)

Former districts of Fukushima Prefecture